Kacung Khoirul or Kacung Munib (born September 27, 1986) is an Indonesian footballer who currently plays for Gresik United in the Indonesia Super League.

References

External links

1986 births
Association football defenders
Living people
Indonesian footballers
Liga 1 (Indonesia) players
Gresik United players
Indonesian Premier Division players
Mitra Kukar players
Persegi Gianyar players